Zhou Cang is a fictional character in the 14th-century Chinese historical novel Romance of the Three Kingdoms.

Story
A strong warrior with a dark face and a wiry beard, Zhou Cang gets caught up in the Yellow Turban Rebellion towards the end of the Eastern Han dynasty and joins the rebels. It is during this time that he first meets Guan Yu, who impresses him with his courage and sense of honour. However, after the rebellion is crushed by Han imperial forces, Zhou Cang becomes a renegade bandit. He inhabits Mount Woniu with another former Yellow Turban rebel, Pei Yuanshao, and becomes known as a warrior of great strength and skill. After encountering Guan Yu again on a mountain road, he swears an oath of allegiance to the worthy general and is appointed as Guan Yu's weapon bearer. A skilled boatman, his talents are critical in Guan Yu's naval assault during the Battle of Fancheng. At Fancheng, he manages to capture the enemy general Pang De during the flooding of the castle. He commits suicide after learning that Guan Yu and Guan Ping have been captured and executed by Sun Quan's forces.

Legacy
Zhou Cang sometimes appears as a door god partnered with Guan Yu in Chinese and Taoist temples. He also sometimes accompanies Guan Yu in his role as a war god, alongside Guan Yu's adopted son Guan Ping. Zhou Cang's face is portrayed as coal black, in contrast to Guan Yu's red and Guan Ping's white.

See also
 Lists of people of the Three Kingdoms
 List of fictional people of the Three Kingdoms

References

 Luo, Guanzhong (14th century). Romance of the Three Kingdoms (Sanguo Yanyi).

Fictional people of the Three Kingdoms
Guan Yu
Chinese gods